Gary Carl Bjorklund is an American physicist specialising in optics in the Department of Applied Physics, Stanford University,

He was elected a Fellow of the American Physical Society in 1986 "for pioneering work in non linear optics and the development and application of widely used techniques in laser spectroscopy, such as frequency modulation spectroscopy" 

He was president of the Optical Society of America in 1997.

See also
Optical Society of America#Past Presidents of the OSA

References

External links
 Articles Published by early OSA Presidents  Journal of the Optical Society of America

]
21st-century American physicists
Year of birth missing (living people)
Living people
Stanford University faculty
Fellows of the American Physical Society
Presidents of Optica (society)